Raúl Márquez Hernández is a Puerto Rican lawyer who served as the Secretary of State of Puerto Rico since August 31, 2020 till January 2, 2021. He was the campaign director of Wanda Vázquez Garced during the 2020 Puerto Rico gubernatorial election. Márquez Hernández was as a contractor and advisor for the legislators Ricardo Llerandi, Gabriel Rodríguez Aguiló, and mayor Carlos Molina and worked closely with Gabriel Rodríguez Aguiló.

Márquez Hernández completed a B.A. at University of Puerto Rico, Río Piedras and a J.D. at Pontifical Catholic University of Puerto Rico School of Law. He earned a LL.M. at Interamerican University of Puerto Rico in litigation and alternate dispute resolution on 2016.

References 

20th-century births
21st-century Puerto Rican lawyers
Interamerican University of Puerto Rico alumni
Living people
New Progressive Party (Puerto Rico) politicians
Pontifical Catholic University of Puerto Rico alumni
Secretaries of State of Puerto Rico
University of Puerto Rico, Río Piedras Campus alumni
Year of birth missing (living people)